Salvador Allende is a 2004 documentary film about Chilean president Salvador Allende, from his election campaign to the coup d'état which ended his life. It was directed by Patricio Guzmán and screened out of competition at the 2004 Cannes Film Festival.

Synopsis
This film shows how Allende came to be elected in Chile and brought hope to much of the population by introducing socialist policies. It also explores the administration of Richard Nixon and its response (including the CIA's Project Fubelt) to Allende's election campaign and presidency.

See also 
 Cinema of Chile

References

External links
 

2004 films
Film
Documentary films about politicians
Documentary films about historical events
Films directed by Patricio Guzmán
Chilean documentary films
2004 documentary films
Chilean biographical films
Films about coups d'état